The 2011 Britcar 24 Hour Race Silverstone was the 7th running of the Silverstone 24 Hours endurance sports car race held on October 1, 2011 at the Silverstone Circuit.

Victory overall and in Class 1 went to the No. 2 Michael McInerny Ferrari F430 GTC driven by Michael McInerny, Sean McInerny, and Phil Keen. Victory in Class 2 went to the No. 27 Topcats Racing Marcos Mantis GT3 driven by David Upton, Neil Huggins, Emily Fletcher, and Jamie Orton. Class 3 was won by the No. 49 Nicholas Mee Racing Aston Martin V8 Vantage GT4 driven by Karsten Le Blanc, Christiaen van Lanschot, Dan de Zille, and Robert Nimkoff. Finally, Class 4 was won by the No. 89 Mark Griffiths BMW M3 E46 driven by Mark Griffiths, William Green, David Forsbrey, and Bill Kirkpatrick.

Race results
Class winners in bold.

References

2011 in British motorsport
October 2011 sports events in the United Kingdom